James George William Harrold (26 March 1892 – 7 October 1950) was an English amateur football centre half who made more than 200 appearances in the Football League for Leicester City. He won two England Amateur caps. He also played cricket and made 11 first-class appearances for Essex between 1923 and 1928.

Personal life 
In March 1917, during the First World War, Harrold enlisted as an air mechanic in the Royal Naval Air Service and was assigned to HMS Daedalus. He later transferred to the RAF Reserve and was discharged in April 1920.

Career statistics

References

1892 births
1950 deaths
Footballers from Poplar, London
English footballers
Association football wing halves
English Football League players
Royal Naval Air Service personnel of World War I
Royal Air Force personnel of World War I
Custom House F.C. players
Leicester City F.C. players
Millwall F.C. players
England amateur international footballers
English cricketers
Essex cricketers
Royal Navy sailors
Royal Air Force airmen